Chimalpopoca may refer to:
Chimalpopoca, Aztec emperor
Chimalpopoca (Moctezuma), son of Moctezuma Xocoyotzin
Chimalpopoca (Tlacopan), ruler of Tlacopan
Faustino Galicia, scholar of Nahuatl
The Codex Chimalpopoca